Fraser of Africa is a comic strip that ran one page a week in full colour in the British comic Eagle in 1960–61, written by George Beardmore and illustrated by Frank Bellamy. It follows Martin Fraser, a white hunter in the game reserves of colonial Tanganyika, as he tracks down an American film star who has gone missing on safari, hunts down European ivory poachers, and helps a Maasai warrior rescue his tribe from Arab slavers. Bellamy, who had long had a fascination with Africa, corresponded with a farmer in Kenya who advised him on the accuracy of the wildlife depicted, and used a limited palette of browns and yellows to capture the parched East African landscape, only occasionally breaking into blues and reds. A collected edition reprinting the first two stories 'Lost Safari' and 'The Ivory Poachers' was published by Hawk Books in 1990. The third and final serial, 'The Slavers' was not included in the collection.

References
 Norman Wright, "Frank Bellamy and Fraser of Africa", introduction to Eagle Classics: Fraser of Africa, Hawk Books, 1990

British comic strips
Adventure comics
Comics set in Africa
Jungle (genre) comics
British comics characters
Comics characters introduced in 1960
1960 comics debuts
1961 comics endings
Fictional explorers
Eagle comic strips
Eagle (comic) characters
Male characters in comics